Paul Michael Valley (born September 24, 1965) is an American television and stage actor.

Early life and education
Valley was born in Whitefish Bay, Wisconsin. When he was eight years old he moved with his family to Greenwich, Connecticut. In 1984 he moved to Washington, D.C., where he attended American University for two years, followed by a year as an apprentice to Michael Kahn, the artistic director of the Shakespeare Theatre Company. Valley then attended the Juilliard School in New York City, where he was a member of the drama division's Group 20 (1987–1991). After his third year at Juilliard, he left to take on roles in television soap operas.

Career
Among his numerous television credits, his most memorable and long-lasting role was his portrayal of Ryan Harrison on the soap opera Another World from 1990 to 1995.  He left the show, and executive producer Jill Farren Phelps had his character shot to death by his brother Grant (Mark Pinter).

Valley then took on stage roles, including Bertram in All's Well That Ends Well at the Shakespeare Theatre and as Thomas Jefferson in 1776 at the Roundabout Theatre, which moved to Broadway in 1997. He followed that with work in regional theater and also appeared in guest roles on the television series Third Watch, Ed, and Law & Order: Special Victims Unit.

In 2011, he starred in the off-Broadway comedy Any Given Monday at the 59E59 Theaters. In 2015 he played the role of Richard Hart in "Hold Outs"  the 9th episode of the 6th season of the CBS police procedural drama Blue Bloods.

References

External links
 

1966 births
Living people
American male television actors
American male soap opera actors
American University alumni
Juilliard School alumni
People from Whitefish Bay, Wisconsin